Marya Mannes (November 14, 1904 – September 13, 1990) was a 20th-century American writer and critic, known for her caustic but insightful observations of American life. Mannes also wrote under the pen name of "Sec."

Life and career
Mannes lived most of her life in New York City, where she was born. Her brother was musician Leopold Mannes. Her parents, Clara (Damrosch) Mannes and David Mannes, founded the Mannes College of Music in New York. Her maternal grandfather was conductor Leopold Damrosch, and her maternal uncles were conductors Walter Damrosch and Frank Damrosch. Her father was Jewish; her mother was from a mostly Lutheran German family (and was of part-Jewish descent through her own grandfather).

Mannes was an editor at Vogue and later wrote prolifically for the magazines The Reporter and The New Yorker. Mannes published a number of books of essays, sharply and wittily critical of American society, including  More in Anger: Some Opinions, Uncensored and Unteleprompted. She was a much-sought-after social commentator on radio and television. She hosted her own 13-week television show on New York's WNEW-TV in 1959, I Speak for Myself.

Other books by Mannes included Subverse (1959), a satirical verse, Out of My Time (1971), an autobiography, and two novels, Message From a Stranger (1948) and They (1968).

Mannes married three times; each union ended in divorce. Her first husband was Broadway scenic designer Jo Mielziner; they wed in 1926. She married artist Richard Blow in 1937, and then married British aircraft executive Christopher Clarkson in 1948. Mannes had one child, David, with second husband Richard Blow.

She died in San Francisco, California.

References

External links

Marya Mannes article at Encyclopædia Britannica.
New York Times obituary, 1990
 Marya Mannes "My Journey through Inner Space" The Baltimore Museum of Art: Baltimore, Maryland, 1965 Accessed June 26, 2012

1904 births
1990 deaths
Writers from New York City
American people of German-Jewish descent
Jewish American writers
Vogue (magazine) people
American magazine editors
Women magazine editors
American women essayists
The New Yorker people
20th-century American women writers
20th-century American essayists
20th-century American Jews